Gerard Cornelis "Gee" van Enst (born 3 March 1945) is a retired Dutch rower. He competed at the 1968 Summer Olympics in the coxed eights event and finished in eighth place.

References

1945 births
Living people
Dutch male rowers
Olympic rowers of the Netherlands
Rowers at the 1968 Summer Olympics
People from Bronckhorst
Sportspeople from Gelderland